Steven L. Sles (born June 16, 1940) is a New Jersey-born contemporary artist, composer and musician. He was born with cerebral palsy, and was a scholar of Hans Hofmann, founder of Abstract Expressionism.

Sles is an established and prolific mouth painter; he is most recognized for his variations of techniques, and fiery abstract palette.

Biography
Sles was born into a Conservative Jewish family. His father co-founded the United Cerebral Palsy Society. Despite the advice of high school guidance counselors, who advised him that his handicap would probably make college attendance impossible, Sles attended Bard College and graduated from Swarthmore College in 1962.

After graduation, Sles became a working artist, painting in New York, Martinique, Paris and Cannes.  He established a studio in Valencia, Spain.

Personal life
Sles was married for 22 years, and raised a daughter.  As an adult, he became an "unconventional modern Hasidic Jew," turning to Jewish mysticism and alternative healing techniques to help him transcend his disability.

See also
AMFPA
MFPA

References 
Markowitz, Laura. "Transcending Corporeality," Swarthmore College Bulletin, September 2004, p. 60.
AMFPA
MFPA
Steven Sles website

1940 births
Living people
20th-century American painters
American male painters
21st-century American painters
20th-century American Jews
People from New Jersey
People with cerebral palsy
Swarthmore College alumni
Mouth and foot painting artists
21st-century American Jews
20th-century American male artists